Joshua Michael Aaron Ryder Wurman (born October 1, 1960) is an American atmospheric scientist and inventor noted for tornado, tropical cyclone, and weather radar research.

Life and career

Education 
Joshua Wurman's father is noted architect and founder of the TED conferences, Richard Saul Wurman. He attended Radnor High School in suburban Philadelphia. He earned a S.B. in physics and interdisciplinary science in 1982, a S.M. in meteorology in 1982, and a Sc.D. in meteorology in 1991, all from MIT. His masters thesis was The Long Range Dispersion of Radioactive Particulates and his doctoral dissertation was Forcing Mechanisms of Thunderstorm Downdrafts. He moved to Boulder, Colorado to work at the National Center for Atmospheric Research (NCAR) and later to Norman, Oklahoma where he was a tenured faculty member at the University of Oklahoma (OU). He founded the Center for Severe Weather Research (CSWR) in 1998, which operates the Doppler On Wheels (DOW) radars. Wurman returned to Boulder in 2001.

Research 
Wurman is particularly interested in researching tornadogenesis and amassing sufficient datasets of tornado structure and dynamics observations for tornado climatology study. He is also the discoverer of sub-kilometer hurricane boundary layer rolls, and wrote the pioneering papers on mapping tornado winds, multiple vortices, and other tornado-related phenomena.

Joshua Wurman participated in both the VORTEX projects, doing early deployments of the first scraped together DOW radars for VORTEX1 and served on the steering committee and was a principal investigator (PI) for VORTEX2, the field research phase of which occurred from 2009-2010.  Wurman's team observed the top two fastest wind events and two contenders for the largest tornado circulations. He leads the ROTATE (Radar Observations of Tornadoes And Thunderstorms Experiment) tornado observational project every spring and hurricane intercepts in the fall. A current major project of his is studying lake-effect snow in the OWLeS.

Dr. Wurman has authored and co-authored many scientific publications relating to hurricane and tornado dynamics and weather radar technology including two articles in Science, articles in the Journal of the Atmospheric Sciences, Monthly Weather Review, Journal of Atmospheric and Oceanic Technology, Weather and Forecasting, and others. He was lead author of a controversial article in the Bulletin of the American Meteorological Society analyzing the potential impacts of a major tornado passing through urban areas.

Radar innovations 

Wurman and his team developed the DOW radars, a new concept of mobile radar, used to observe tornadoes, tropical cyclones, wildfires, winter storms, and other phenomena from close range. He built the first DOW in 1995 from spare parts from NCAR and other facilities and as of March 2014 has built eight DOW units. The success of the DOWs led to a revolution of mobile radars in severe storms and other meteorological field research.

Furthermore, they developed meteorological bistatic radar multiple-Doppler networks, and the Rapid-Scan DOW, and holds about several patents related to bistatic and DOW technology. He founded BINET Inc., manufacturer of Bistatic Networks, in 1995.

National profile 
He manages the DOW radar network which is a National Science Foundation (NSF) Lower Atmospheric Observing Facility. His scientific work and DOW projects have been sponsored by NSF, as well as National Oceanic and Atmospheric Administration (NOAA), the United States Forest Service (USFS), the United States Department of Energy (DOE), the Federal Aviation Administration (FAA), and other agencies of the U.S. government, as well as by The Discovery Channel, and the National Geographic Society, among others.

Wurman is a member of the USA Science and Engineering Festival's Nifty Fifty, a collection of the most influential scientists and engineers in the United States that are dedicated to reinvigorating the interest of young people in science and engineering.

In popular culture
Wurman has appeared in many television shows and his work, particularly with the DOWs, and is cited in numerous popular and technical books about weather. He is best known to the general public as the "scientist" in The Discovery Channel's reality series Storm Chasers, where he led a group of storm chasers conducting research during tornado season. CSWR worked with Sean Casey's Tornado Intercept Vehicle (TIV) combining in situ intercept data and photogrammetry work with DOW remote sensing data. His scientific research style is often shown clashing with other chasers who are not government funded.

He was also featured on National Geographic Channel's Tornado Intercept and The True Face of Hurricanes, as well as in the IMAX film Forces of Nature. He's also been seen in several other documentaries and shows including those on PBS' Nova and NewsHour, NHK, BBC, History Channel, and The Weather Channel (TWC), and on Dateline NBC, CBS' 48 Hours, Larry King Live, Nightline, and Good Morning America.

Popular articles describing his work have appeared in Discover, Scientific American, New Scientist, The Economist, Biography, Newsweek, Time, FHM, Self, The New York Times, USA Today, The Washington Post, and many other publications.

See also
 Howard Bluestein
 Paul Markowski
 Erik N. Rasmussen
 Roger Wakimoto

References
Notes

Sources

 USPTO Patent Full-Text and Image Database
 The Hunt for the Supertwister
 Tracking Tornadoes, Nature's Most Powerful Winds
 Guinness Book of World Records (2007)
 http://eol.ucar.edu/basics/wx_2_c.html
 Design of a Bistatic Dual-Doppler Radar for Retrieving Vector Winds Using one Transmitter and a Remote Low-gain Passive Receiver
 Joshua Wurman CV (2007)

External links
 Joshua Wurman's homepage at the Center for Severe Weather Research (CSWR)
 WeatherBrains interview, 10 March 2014
 

1960 births
Living people
American meteorologists
American science writers
Jewish American scientists
Massachusetts Institute of Technology School of Science alumni
Storm chasers
University of Oklahoma faculty
21st-century American inventors
21st-century American Jews